The J.T. Murphy No. 1 Crater is the site of a historic oil-drilling accident near Norphlet, Union County, Arkansas. On May 14, 1922, an oil drilling crew completed a  well, dubbed J.T. Murphy No. 1, and began pumping. The early production was entirely natural gas, which began escaping from the drill collar. Eventually it caught fire, burning for several hours, and destroying the derrick. It also caused a series of violent underground explosions. The land, which had previously been in cotton production, was abandoned, and has gradually returned to forest.

The site was listed on the National Register of Historic Places in 2008.

See also
National Register of Historic Places listings in Union County, Arkansas

References

National Register of Historic Places in Arkansas
Geography of Union County, Arkansas
National Register of Historic Places in Union County, Arkansas
1922 in Arkansas
Petroleum in Arkansas
Gas explosions in the United States
1922 disasters in the United States
Oil wells on the National Register of Historic Places